The Gyermekvasút or Line 7 is a narrow gauge railway line in Budapest, which connects  and Hűvösvölgy and is  long. The former name of the line was Úttörővasút (Pioneer Railway, in reference to the communist scouts), and now the official designation is MÁV Zrt. Széchenyi-hegy Gyermekvasút. Except the train driver, all of the posts are operated by children aged 10–14 under adult supervision. It is the world's largest children's railway.

The Széchenyihegy terminus of the Gyermekvasút is a  walk from the upper terminus of the Budapest Cog Railway, whilst the Hűvösvölgy terminus is adjacent to the Budapest tram terminus of the same name.

History
In 1947, the Hungarian State Railways (MÁV) company decided that a railway operated by children would be built. For the railway construction several sites were considered, including the neighbourhood of the Gödöllő Palace, Margaret Island, and the Népliget, but finally in 1948 the Hungarian Communist Party chose the Buda Hills. The construction started on 11 April 1948.

The first section, from Széchenyi-hegy to Előre station (now Virágvölgy) was inaugurated on 31 July 1948.

During the Hungarian Revolution of 1956 the railway was closed but was not damaged. It reopened on 3 February 1957.

A museum at Hűvösvölgy station displays some items from the Communist period.

References

External links
 
 

Regional rail in Hungary
1948 establishments in Hungary
Children's railways
760 mm gauge railways in Hungary
Narrow gauge railways in Hungary
Buildings and structures in Budapest